Carndochan Castle is a ruined stone castle near Llanuwchllyn, Gwynedd, north Wales. It was probably built in the early thirteenth century and is a Scheduled Ancient Monument.

History
The castle stands on a ridge overlooking the Lliw Valley; its early history is unrecorded, but it is thought to have been built by Prince Llywelyn ap Iorwerth between 1215 and 1230. Little is known of the site's history although King Edward I of England visited in 1283–84.

Description
Built in typical Welsh style, it consisted of a D-shaped tower on its western end with smaller round or semi-round towers surrounding a small ward and square central tower. Two of the other towers are dry stone-built and resemble to those at Cam Fadryn and Pen y Castell. A preliminary 2015 excavation in the southern part of the castle revealed the entrance, a small half-round tower and a length of curtain wall. The excavation recovered two pieces of charcoal that radiocarbon dating yielded dates of 1170–1258 for one and 1220–1271 for the other.

It is not known when or why Carndochan was abandoned, although unsubstantiated excavations by nineteenth-century archaeologists apparently discovered substantial amounts of ash under the ruins, suggesting the castle was either sacked or demolished (often termed slighting). Today, the site is protected as a scheduled monument.

References

Further reading

External links

Castles in Gwynedd
Llanuwchllyn
Scheduled monuments in Wales